St David's Roman Catholic High School is a Catholic secondary state school located at Cousland Road in Dalkeith, Midlothian, Scotland. It has shared the same campus with Dalkeith High School since 2003.

Pupils
The school had a roll of almost 800 pupils in 2012. 75% of St David's pupils come from associated Catholic primary schools in Midlothian and East Lothian.

History
St David's High School was established in Dalkeith in 1948. In August 1966 the school moved to Abbey Road in what were originally the grounds of Newbattle Abbey. In November 2003, St. David's was integrated into the Dalkeith Schools Community Campus along with Dalkeith High and Saltersgate School, a special education facility, making it the first such joint secondary school campus in Scotland. After the move, teachers kept students separated from each other in the dining hall and on the playground, citing concern that younger pupils might become disoriented by the sudden transformation of their small school into a large, integrated organisation with 2,200 youths. They initially predicted that the regime of segregation could be relaxed within a few weeks, and that religious factors played no role in their decision; by January 2004, teachers at Dalkeith and St. David's still told their pupils not to talk to pupils from the other school, and students were kept segregated due to threats of violence directed at one another and teachers of different religious backgrounds in addition to assaults.

School of Football
St David's High School are currently in their second year of delivering the School of Football program and are intending to introduce a new S1 group each year for the foreseeable future.

Notable former students

Darren Fletcher, former football player for the Scotland national team; was inducted into Midlothian Council's Hall of Fame in 2009.

Social media 

St David's RC High School uses social media to communicate school information, events and updates to parents and pupils.

See also
 St David's Church, Dalkeith

References

External links

Official site
St David's R.C. High School's page on Scottish Schools Online

Catholic secondary schools in Midlothian
1948 establishments in Scotland
Dalkeith
School buildings completed in 2003
Educational institutions established in 1948
Secondary schools in Midlothian